Goniothalamus macrocalyx is a species of plant in the Annonaceae family. It is endemic to Vietnam.

References

macrocalyx
Endemic flora of Vietnam
Vulnerable plants
Taxonomy articles created by Polbot
Taxa named by Nguyên Tiên Bân